"Beat Crazy" is the title track to the Joe Jackson Band's 1981 album, Beat Crazy. Written by Joe Jackson, and sung by Graham Maby, it was released as a single in 1981.

Background
According to Jackson, when he performed the song live at Pinkpop Festival in 1980, the song is dedicated to "drug-crazed teenagers all over the world." The lyrics of the song complain of how kids of the time are too busy on drugs - saying that they are all too "beat crazy" - to take responsibility and get jobs. Musically, the song, like many others on Beat Crazy, is more reggae-influenced than songs on Jackson's previous two albums. Unlike many other songs by Jackson, the lead vocals are performed by bassist Graham Maby with Jackson on supporting vocals. The vocals also feature an echo effect.

"Beat Crazy" saw a single release in January 1981 as the second single from Beat Crazy (the first being "Mad at You," which did not chart). Backed with a rerecording of Jackson's first hit, "Is She Really Going Out With Him?," the song failed to chart. A third single, "One to One," also failed commercially.

Reception
"Beat Crazy" was described by AllMusic reviewer Chris True as  Jackson's "first real attempt at breaking out of his quasi-snide power pop and bringing in other styles and musical forms to add depth to his work." He continues, saying, "He pulls it off fairly well, he is a pretty good songwriter and has a great ear for sound and production, but, as stated before, reggae was already a minor element in rock at the time, so it doesn't really make or break the song, it’s just a small step into new ground."

The song is also a personal favorite of Joe Jackson's. On his official website, Jackson, who felt that the Beat Crazy album was mixed, said, "There’s some good stuff on it," later saying, "I especially like the title track and 'Biology'."

Personnel
Joe Jackson - supporting vocals
Graham Maby - lead vocals, bass
Gary Sanford - guitar
Dave Haughton - drums

References

Joe Jackson (musician) songs
1981 singles
Songs written by Joe Jackson (musician)
1980 songs
A&M Records singles